The 2013 Japan Golf Tour season was played from 14 March to 8 December. The season consisted of 25 official money events, mostly in Japan, as well as the four majors and the four World Golf Championships. The first two events of the year, played in Thailand and Indonesia, were co-sanctioned with the OneAsia Tour, the first time this has happened with the Japan Golf Tour.

Schedule
The following table lists official events during the 2013 season.

Unofficial events
The following events were sanctioned by the Japan Golf Tour, but did not carry official money, nor were wins official.

Money list
The money list was based on prize money won during the season, calculated in Japanese yen.

Notes

References

External links

Japan Golf Tour
Japan Golf Tour
Golf Tour